Puerto Rico Highway 194 (PR-194) is a road located in Fajardo, Puerto Rico, passing through its downtown. This highway begins at its intersection with PR-3 and PR-53 in Quebrada Vueltas and ends at its junction with PR-3 and PR-940 in Quebrada Fajardo.

Major intersections

See also

 List of highways numbered 194

References

External links
 

194
Fajardo, Puerto Rico